Alfred Ferko (born 15 October 1964) is a former Albanian football player and coach.

Club career
As soon as Albanians were free to leave the country after the end of the communist era, Ferko moved abroad to play alongside compatriot Roland Iljadhi in neighboring Greece for Panachaiki Patras.

International career
He made his debut for Albania in an October 1986 European Championship qualification match against Austria and earned a total of 9 caps, scoring no goals.

His final international was a January 1992 friendly match against Greece.

Honours
Albanian Superliga: 1
 1990

References

External links

1964 births
Living people
People from Vlorë
Association football midfielders
Albanian footballers
Albania international footballers
Flamurtari Vlorë players
FK Dinamo Tirana players
Panachaiki F.C. players
Albanian expatriate footballers
Expatriate footballers in Greece
Albanian expatriate sportspeople in Greece
Albanian football managers
Flamurtari Vlorë managers
FK Egnatia managers
KF Teuta Durrës managers
Shkumbini Peqin managers
Kategoria Superiore players
Kategoria Superiore managers